Lomako-Yokokala Nature Reserve is a protected area in the Democratic Republic of the Congo. It covers portions of Bas-Uélé and Tshuapa provinces. It was established in 1991 especially to protect the habitat of the Bonobo apes. This site covers 3,601.88 km2.

References

Protected areas of the Democratic Republic of the Congo
Bas-Uélé
Tshuapa